Orikum or Pashaliman is a town and a former municipality in Vlorë County, southwestern Albania. At the 2015 local government reform it became a subdivision of the municipality Vlorë. It was named after the ancient city Oricum, which was located 4 km west of modern Orikum. The population at the 2011 census was 5,503. The municipal unit consists of the town Orikum and the villages Dukat Fushë, Dukat, Tragjas and Radhimë. Nearby the modern city is located the only marina in Albania, Marina of Orikum (as of 2011).

External links
Municipality Official Website
Orikum Marina Official Website

References 

Former municipalities in Vlorë County
Administrative units of Vlorë
Towns in Albania